is a 1972 Japanese television series. It is the tenth NHK taiga drama.

Story
Shin Heike Monogatari deals with the Heian period. Based on Eiji Yoshikawa's novel by the same title.

The story chronicles the life of Taira no Kiyomori.

Staff
 Original story : Eiji Yoshikawa
 Music : Isao Tomita

Cast

Taira Clan
Tatsuya Nakadai as Taira no Kiyomori 
Tamao Nakamura as Taira no Tokiko, Kiyomori's wife
Tsutomu Yamazaki as Taira no Tokitada
Yoshiko Sakuma as Taira no Tokuko
Daijirō Harada as Taira no Shigemori
Homare Suguro as Taira no Munemori
Mizutani Yaeko I as Ikenozenni
Ikkō Furuya as Taira no Tsunemori
Hiromi Go as young Tsunemori
Akira Nakao as Taira no Tadanori

Minamoto  Clan
 Takamaru Sasaki as Minamoto no Tameyoshi 
 Isao Kimura as Minamoto no Yoshitomo
 Koji Takahashi as Minamoto no Yoritomo
 Taro Shigaki as Minamoto no Yoshitsune
 Makoto Satō as Benkei
 Goro Ibuki as Minamoto no Tametomo
 Ayako Wakao as Tokiwa Gozen
 Daisuke Katō as Hōjō Tokimasa
 Komaki Kurihara as Hōjō Masako
 Toshiyuki Nishida as Hojo Yoshitoki

Emperors
Osamu Takizawa as Emperor Shirakawa and Emperor Go-Shirakawa
Masakazu Tamura as Emperor Sutoku
Kataoka Takao as Emperor Takakura

Others
Masayuki Mori as Fujiwara no Tadazane
Masako Izumi as Yomogiko
Akiko Koyama as Fujiwara no Nariko
Seiichiro Kameishi as Fujiwara no Nobuyori
Eiji Okada as Kumagai Naozane
Yoichi Hayashi as Kiso Yoshinaka
Shinsuke Ashida as Minamoto no Yorimasa
Takeshi Kusaka
Makoto Fujita
Junkichi Orimoto as Minamoto no Yukiie
Tōru Emori as Higuchi Kanemitsu
Seiji Miyaguchi as Fujiwara no Shunzei
Yoshi Kato as Fujiwara no Hidehira
Yukio Minagawa as Saigyō
Rinichi Yamamoto as Jitsusōbō
Mikio Narita as Fujiwara no Yorinaga
Kin'ya Kitaōji as Prince Mochihito
Ken Ogata as Abei no Asadori
Eitaro Ozawa as Shinzei

References

External links

1972 Japanese television series debuts
1972 Japanese television series endings
1970s drama television series
Cultural depictions of Minamoto no Yoshitsune
Cultural depictions of Taira no Kiyomori
Cultural depictions of Hōjō Masako
Jidaigeki television series
Taiga drama
Television series set in the 12th century